National Highway 715A, commonly called NH 715A is a national highway in  India. It is a spur road of National Highway 15.  NH-715A traverses the state of Assam in India.

Route
Nakhola(Jagiroad), Marigaon, Bhuragaon, Kaupati, Rowta, Udalguri, Khoirabari, Indo/Bhutan border(Bhairabkunda).

Junctions  
 
Terminal with National Highway 27 near Nakhola.

Junction with National Highway 15 near Rowta.

See also 
List of National Highways in India by highway number

List of National Highways in India by state

References

External links 

 NH 715A on OpenStreetMap

National highways in India
National Highways in Assam